Sweet Dreams is a 2018 Chinese television series starring Dilraba Dilmurat and Deng Lun. The series premiered on June 25, 2018 on Hunan TV. 
The series has reached 6 billion views before the drama wrapped its run.
and also received positive reviews for its unique story setting, fresh perspective on the occupation of floriculture and humorous "variety" sense.

Synopsis
Ling Ling Qi, a kind-hearted girl, has a crush on renowned florist, Bo Hai. Determined to get closer to him, she applies for work at his company, Flower Plus. One day, they come across bracelets designed to promote better sleep by controlling brain waves. When they try them on, the devices malfunction and merge Ling Ling Qi’s brain waves with Bo Hai’s. Thus, Ling Ling Qi is transported into all of Bo Hai’s dreams where she helps him overcome some of his childhood traumas.

Cast

Main

 Dilraba Dilmurat as Ling Ling Qi
 An ordinary girl who is kind and helpful. She is Bo Hai's diehard fangirl. However, her low IQ and self-esteem has affected her life, hindering her career and preventing her from achieving her dreams. Although she has studied to be a veterinarian, she applied to Flower Plus three times (once per year) just so she could be with her idol. Despite Zhou Xin Yan's sabotage on her third try, she manages to get into Flower Plus as a salesperson instead of a florist. She later finds out that Bo Hai has a different personality and not like the one in her dreams. However, they manage to get closer after Ling Ling Qi discovers his secret. After she helps him through one of Wen Guang Qi's schemes and displays her skills at flower arrangement, she was promoted to a florist. She later betrays Bo Hai because she thought the betrayal would save him and his company from Liu Ying Jie/William and Mo Nan's schemes.
 Deng Lun as Bo Hai
 A florist, and President of Flower Plus company. He has high IQ but low EQ. He has pyrophobia after being traumatized by a fire in his childhood, which also causes his temporary colorblindness. He was able to finally overcome this weakness with the help of Ling Ling Qi.

Supporting

 Chen Yilong as Mo Nan
 He works at Flower Plus as a spy to get revenge on Bo Hai for his father's death. He finds out that it was Liu Ying Jie/William who actually killed his father and that he was blaming the wrong person the whole time. He later works with Bo Hai to bring down Liu Ying Jie/William. He has a crush on Ling Ling Qi.
 Zhu Xudan as Zhou Xin Yan
 Marketing director of Flower Plus. In the beginning of the series, she has a big crush on Bo Hai. She uses every means possible to get rid of Ling Ling Qi as she sees her as a threat, but fails to do so every time because Bo Hai was making sure Ling Ling Qi stays by his side. Later on, she lets go of Bo Hai and accepts Chen Mo's feelings. After becoming Chen Mo's girlfriend, her personality did a 180 change, from accepting Ling Ling Qi to becoming more social with the Flower Plus' employees.
 Zhang Haowei as Chen Mo
 Bo Hai's secretary and close friend. He has feelings for Zhou Xin Yan and never fails to comfort her when she's feeling down by supplying her with her favorite lollipops. While trying to woo Xin Yan, he and Ling Ling Qi become closer.
 Wang Ruizi as Lu Bao Ni
 Ling Ling Qi's close friend. Human Resources manager of Flower Plus. She has a secret crush Mo Nan.
 Qu Gaowei as Wen Guangqi
 Vice president of Flower Plus. Bo Hai's opponent. Liu Ying Jie/William's initial pawn in Flower Plus before Mo Nan exposed him.
 Wang Bingxiang as Shi Ji
 Wen Guangqi's assistant. Was sacrificed as the "spy" so Mo Nan's identity would not be exposed.
 Zhang Junming as Lv Dawei
 Employee of Flower Plus. Lu Bao Ni's admirer.
 Ming Ziyu as Zhen Qi
 Employee of Flower Plus. A Bo Hai fangirl.
 Xu Zixuan as Lu Sisi
 Employee of Flower Plus.

 Huang Wen as Zhang Lili
 Dong Ziheng as Xin Ba
 Fu Jia as Ling Guoliang
 Ling Ling Qi's father. He is very a stingy but caring parent.
 Yang Kun as Song Ling Ling
 Ling Ling Qi's mother. She participates in the community dances and likes to compete with Li Li Jun. Constantly gossips about her daughter's love life.
 Tse Kwan-ho as Liu Ying Jie/William
 Mo Nan's aka second father and corporate spy. Formerly the financial manager of Yunhe Floriculture. He wanted revenge on Mo Nan and Bo Hai because he blamed their parents, Yin Chang He (Mo Nan's dad) and Lu Yun Qing (Bo Hai's mom) for not giving him the money to get treatment for his five-year-old son's leukemia. He had killed Yin Chang He in the office and set a fire in Bo Hai's home (cause of Lu Yun Qing's death and Bo Hai's pyrophobia). He then took Mo Nan and raised him as his pawn for him to one day get rid of Bo Hai (his reasoning was that because his own son died, so Yin Chang He and Lu Yun Qing's sons must also die). In the end, he was found not guilty of his prior crimes but was sentenced for intentional manslaughter.
 Lu Xingyu as Li Boqing
 Liu Qiushi as Ji Bin
 Mo Nan's right hand man. He was caught by William's men as he was asked by Mo Nan to find out the truth about William, but he later escaped.
 Gao Mingyang as Wu Fan
 Liu Ying Jie/Williams' secretary.
 Li Jinyang as Ma Xiaoyi
 Gao Hai as Luo Xian'nian
 Du Yafei as Wang Jianming
 Teng Xuan as Lu Yun Qing
 Bo Hai's mom. Died in the fire that was caused by Liu Ying Jie/William.
 Yang Lei as Xiao Fang

Soundtrack

Ratings 

 Highest ratings are marked in red, lowest ratings are marked in blue

International broadcast

References

External links
 Sweet Dreams on Sina Weibo

2018 Chinese television series debuts
2018 Chinese television series endings
Chinese science fiction television series
Chinese romantic comedy television series
Television series by Jay Walk Studio
Television shows about dreams
Hunan Television dramas